Thatta District  is located in the southern area, locally called Laar, of the province of Sindh, Pakistan. Its capital is Thatta. It is home to a large necropolis of Makli. In 2013, several talukas were separated to form the new Sujawal District.

History

The capital of three successive native Sindhi dynasties and later ruled by the Mughal. Thatta was the capital of three successive dynasties, the traces of which are evident in the Makli necropolis, which spreads over a twelve square kilometer area. These dynasties are: Samma (1335-1520), Arghun (1520-1555) and Tarkhan (1555-1665). Thatta was constantly embellished from the 14th to the 18th century. The remains of the city and its necropolis provide a unique view of civilization in Sindh. Thatta also served as capital of Sindh and as a center for Islamic arts.

Since the 14th century four Muslim dynasties ruled Sindh from Thatta, but in 1739 the capital was moved elsewhere and Thatta declined. It was believed that this was the place where Alexander the Great rested his legions after their long march. The town is dominated by the Great Mosque built by the Moghul Emperor Shahjahan which has been carefully restored to its original condition. The mosque's 33 arched domes give it superb acoustics and the tile work, a whole range of shades of blue, is equally fine.

Situated on the outskirts of the new town, it is surrounded by narrow lanes and multi-story houses made of plaster and wood which are top by badgers, the wind catchers designed to funnel cool breezes down into the interiors of buildings. They are also quite common in Hyderabad.

The bazaars of Thatta are known for hand-printed fabrics, glass bangles and Sindhi embroidery work in laid with tinny mirrors, one of the more world known handicrafts of Pakistan. Thatta appears to have scarcely moved out of the 18th century and is only slowly catching up with the modern world.

The shifting nature of the Indus makes it difficult to discern the exact location of ancient Thatta, but the name indicates its strong relation to the Indus. Thatta, derived from Thatti, Thatt or Thatto, a Sindhi word for a small settlement on riverbanks, was an important medieval city locally known as Nagar-Thato. All historic accounts paint Thatta as a populous and flourishing trading post and a refuge of saints and scholars.

Jam Nizamu-d Din or Jam Ninda, as he was affectionately known, ruled in Sindh's golden age as the leader of Samma-dynasty from 866 to 1461. The rise of Thatta as an important commercial and cultural center was directly related to his patronage and policies. The Samma-civilization contributed significantly to the evolution of the prevailing architectural style that can be classified as Sindhi-Islamic.

The site became closely interlinked with the lives of the people. Every year thousands perform pilgrimage to this site to commemorate the saints buried here. The graves testify to a period of four centuries when Thatta was a thriving center of trade, religion and scholarly pursuits and the capital of Sind. In 1768, Thatta's per-eminence was usurped by Hyderabad. Though many of the mausoleums and graves are dilapidated, many are still exquisite architectural examples with fine stone carving and glazed tile decoration.

Jam Nizamu-d Din's death was followed by a war of succession carried out between the cousins, Jam Feroz and Jam Salahu-d Din. The Moghul army took the opportunity and Thatta came under the Arghun dynasty. The refined tastes of the Arghun and later the Tarkhan, who came from the Timurid cities of Khurasan and Central Asia enhanced Thatta's cultural and architectural landscape.

The reign of Mirza Isa Tarkhan's son Mirza Baki however, was one of persecution. He became reputed as one of the cruelest rulers of Sind. Thatta witnessed the cold-blooded murder of the Arghuns and the persecution of people claiming nobility, or religious or scholarly eminence. Mirza Jani Beg is known to have worked to restore what Mirza Baki had destroyed. However, when Emperor Akbar sent Nawab Khan Khanan to subjugate Thatta, Mirza Jani Beg is said to have removed the people to Kalan Kot, a fortified town built for such occasions, and ordered Thatta to be razed. 
Mirza Jani Beg negotiated with Mughals, and was taken to Emperor Akbar court where he was confirmed as the governor of Thatta, and in 1591, Sindh was annexed by the Mughal Empire. Mughal rule lasted till 1736 when Thatta passed into the hands of the Kalhoras. Thatta's importance began to gradually decline as the Indus River began to shift away and in 1768, Hyderabad was made the capital of Sindh by the Kalhora Nawabs.

The British annexed Sindh in 1843 and their immediate concern was to establish a communication network throughout Sindh. The municipality of Thatta was established by the British in 1854 and several vernacular and private schools, as well as a post office, a dispensary and a subordinate jail were built. The British established their residential areas away from the main city, on higher grounds, west of Makli necropolis. Thatta regained prosperity because of an improved communication infrastructure, though the city was never completely revived its prior importance as capital. The late nineteenth century saw a new class of merchants who took full advantage of the British need for services and goods. These merchants became rich and commissioned many buildings inspired by the elegant mansions constructed by the British throughout the British Empire.

Post-independence Thatta is rapidly growing and suffers from a severe lack of basic services. Heavy demands on the resources of the city, coupled with the general apathy on the part of the local administration, has resulted in the neglect of the city's historic center. The Makli monuments and other historic mosques, although of touristic value, are disregarded with nothing being done to preserve them.

Local government
The district is now administratively subdivided into 4 Tehsils

 Thatta
 Mirpur Sakro
 Keti Bander
 Ghorabari

The 2015/ 2016 local bodies election was decisively won by the liberal Pakistan People's Party (PPP) and Ghulam Qadir Palijo was elected as the Chairman of the district. Palijo was earlier an elected Member of the Sindh Assembly (MPA) from Mirpur Sakro, Thatta.

Demography
At the time of the 2017 census, Thatta district had a population of 982,138, of which 510,143 were males and 471,958 females. The rural population was 805,662 (82.03%) and urban 176,476 (17.97%). The literacy rate is 27.88%: 35.46% for males and 19.63% for females.

Religion

The majority religion is Islam, with 96.75% of the population. Hinduism (including those from Scheduled Castes) is practiced by 3.04% of the population.

Language

At the time of the 2017 census, 92.92% of the population spoke Sindhi, 1.40% Urdu, 1.33% Pashto, 1.10% Punjabi and 1.05% Balochi as their first language.

List of Dehs (towns, villages)
The following is a list of Thatta District's dehs:

 Jungshahi
 Makli
 Sheikhani
 Thatta
 Miyani
 Gharo
 Gono
 Karampur
 Mirpur Sakro

See also
 Marho Kotri Wildlife Sanctuary
 Haleji Lake

References

Bibliography 

 
Districts of Sindh